Blood Feast 2: All U Can Eat is a 2002 slasher splatter film directed by Herschell Gordon Lewis and starring John McConnell, Mark McLachlan, Melissa Morgan, Toni Wynne, and J.P. Delahoussaye. It is the sequel to the 1963 film Blood Feast. Filmed under a working title of Blood Feast 2: Buffet of Blood and using the same grindhouse style as its predecessor, the film continues the story began in the original film, where a grandson of Fuad Ramses attempts to restart his grandfather's catering business. The film depicts the killer falling victim to spirit possession by the goddess Ishtar.

The film was completed a year before its release but had trouble finding a distributor.

Plot 

Fuad Ramses III (J.P. Delahoussaye) returns to Miami to reopen his grandfather's defunct catering company. This arouses the interest of the local sheriff (Mark McLachlan), who holds Fuad's family reputation in ill favor. Fuad is soon, however, asked to cater the sheriff's wedding by his mother-in-law, Mrs. Lampley (Melissa Morgan), and fiancee, Tiffani (Toni Wynne). After finding his grandfather's statue of Ishtar, an Egyptian Babylonian goddess, in a utility closet, he becomes possessed by her evil spirit. He then goes on to create the 'blood feast' his grandfather failed to do, by targeting Tiffani's six bridesmaids: Bambi (Christy Brown), Misti (Christina Cuenca), Brandi (Cindy Roubal), Trixie (Kristi Polit), Candi (Jill Rao) and Laci (Michelle Miller) and making them into party food for the wedding.

Cast
 John McConnell as Detective Dave Loomis
 Mark McLachlan as Detective Mike Myers
 Melissa Morgan as Mrs. Lampley
 Toni Wynne as Tiffani Lampley
 J.P. Delahoussaye as Fuad Ramses III
 Chris Mauer as Mr. Lampley
 Christy Brown as Bambi Deere
 Christina Cuenca as Misti Morning
 Michelle Miller as Laci Hundees
 Kristi Polit as Trixie Treater
 Jill Rao as Candi Graham
 Cindy Roubal as Brandi Alexander
 Veronica Russell as The Secretary
 John Waters as Reverend
 Penelope Helmer as Officer Pippi
 Stevie Leininger as "Stripey"
 Billy Slaughter as Best Man

Release 
The film had its world premiere at the 2001 Butt-Numb-A-Thon in Austin, Texas. It had its UK premiere at the Dead by Dawn Edinburgh Horror Film Festival in Edinburgh, Scotland on 31 March 2002, and was released on DVD by Media Blasters' horror label Shriek Show on 29 July.

References

External links 
 
 

2002 films
2000s comedy horror films
American comedy horror films
Parodies of horror
American sequel films
American splatter films
Films directed by Herschell Gordon Lewis
Films set in Miami
Films about cannibalism
2002 comedy films
Films based on Egyptian mythology
Inanna
Films about spirit possession
2000s English-language films
2000s American films